At least two warships of Japan have borne the name Hyūga:

 , was an  launched in 1917 and sunk in 1945
 , is a  launched in 2007

Japanese Navy ship names